Robert Couturier (2 May 1905 – 1 October 2008) was a French sculptor. He was born in Angoulême.

Biography
In 1920, he joined the École Estienne à Paris and trained in lithography.  On his father's death he was forced to interrupt his studies and joined a lithography studio in Paris. In 1929 he met the sculptor Alfred Janniot and the following year he won the Prix Blumenthal.  In 1932 he won a place as an art professor in Paris, where he met several painters, including Henri Matisse, from whom he received much advice.  He was also at one point a student of Aristide Maillol and collaborated with him in 1938

Couturier became a laureate of the Fondation Américaine pour la pensée et l'art français in 1930.  In 1937 he created the sculptures for the pavillon de l'élégance at the Exposition Internationale in collaboration with the architect Emile Aillaud.  He was taken prisoner during the German occupation of France but escaped and reached the unoccupied zone.  On the Liberation, he was made professor at Paris's École des Ars décoratifs, and later became a professor at Paris's École nationale supérieure des Beaux-Arts.  In 1947 he exhibited at the London exhibition of Anglo-French art at the Anglo-French Art Centre, in 1950 at the Venice Biennale and in 1951 at the Sao-Paulo Biennale.

He was the subject of devoted exhibitions at the musée Rodin (1970) and the Monnaie de Paris (1975).  He won the prix Wildestein in 1966 and was a founder-member of the Salon de Mai.  Works by him are on display in museums and galleries in Paris, Bayeux, Poitiers, Madrid, Rio de Janeiro, Boston, Jerusalem, Hakone, Antwerp and Havana.

In 2005 Couturier had a retrospective exhibition of his work celebrating his 100 years birthday at the Musée Maillol in Paris.

He died at the age of 103.

References

External links
"Robert Couturier" in the Encyclopédie audiovisuelle de l'art contemporain

1905 births
2008 deaths
People from Angoulême
French centenarians
Prix Blumenthal
20th-century French sculptors
20th-century French male artists
French male sculptors
Men centenarians